The rue d'Orsel is a street in the 18th arrondissement of Paris. It was previously known as the rue des Acacias. It is in the neighborhood surrounding Montmartre, the butte (hill) where the Basilique du Sacré-Cœur is located.

Orsel, rue de